Enough Is Enough is an anti-fascist single from Chumbawamba & Credit to the Nation, on Chumbawamba's album Anarchy. It reached #56 on UK charts in 1993 and was supported by a music video, which can be seen here.

The b-side, "Hear No Bullshit (On Fire Mix)", is a remix of the Credit to the Nation single "Hear No Bullshit See No Bullshit Say No Bullshit" released the same year, and samples Chumbawamba's Song "Mouthful of Shit" from their album Anarchy.

In July 2000, the band gave away a one-track CD of a remix of the song featuring new topical lyrics, called "Enough Is Enough (Kick It Over)", at their shows in Austria. This was following the formation of a coalition government including the FPÖ, a party led by (now-deceased) Austrian politician and Nazi apologist Jörg Haider, who later that year stepped down from direct control of the party due to international pressure. The mp3 of the song is available for free from Chumbawamba's website here.

Commercial performance
The song gave Chumbawamba their first entry on the UK Singles Chart. It debuted on the chart dated 18 September 1993, at number 56; the following week, it fell to number 64. The song remained their highest-charting in the UK until "Tubthumping" peaked at number 2 on the chart four years later.

Track listing
Enough Is Enough (4:35)
Hear No Bullshit (On Fire Mix) (4:20)
The Day The Nazi Died (1993 Mix) (2:38)

References

Discogs entry.

Chumbawamba songs
1993 singles
Songs against racism and xenophobia
One Little Indian Records singles
1993 songs
Songs against capitalism
Anti-fascist music
Song articles with missing songwriters